Group A of the EuroBasket Women 2019 took place between 27 and 30 June 2019. The group consisted of Great Britain, Latvia, Spain and Ukraine and played its games at Riga, Latvia.

Standings

All times are local (UTC+3).

Matches

Great Britain vs Latvia

Ukraine vs Spain

Latvia vs Ukraine

Spain vs Great Britain

Ukraine vs Great Britain

Latvia vs Spain

References

External links
Official website

Group A
2018–19 in Ukrainian basketball
2018–19 in British basketball
2018–19 in Spanish women's basketball
2018–19 in Latvian basketball